Jishnu Gupta, often spelled Jishnugupta, was a de facto ruler of Nepal in the 7th-century during the time of the Lichchhavi dynasty. Initially sharing the administrative powers with Dhruvadeva from 624 CE, he became the highest authority in the realm from around 627. He belonged to the Abhira-Gupta dynasty.

Usurpation 
Amshuverma had appointed his brother-in-law Udaydeva as the monarch and after the death of the former, the latter became the king in 621. He was soon ousted along with his family to Tibet, and his brother Dhruvadeva, with the help of Jishnu Gupta proclaimed the throne. Even though Dhruvadeva was the official monarch, Jishnu Gupta exercised much of the authority and from around 627, Jishnu ruled as a de facto ruler.

Reign 
He issued several coins issued under his name beginning from 627, and at least ten inscriptions have been found starting from 616.  Almost all of his inscriptions substantiate his reign as a de facto ruler under the powerless Lichchhavi monarchs Dhruvadeva, and later his son, Bhimarjunadeva. The Lichchhavis resided at Managriha palace and Jishnu Gupta ruled from Kailashkut Bhawan. The following two addresses, given to the monarch Dhruvadeva "embody the most unostentatious form of address ever ascribed to a sovereign", opiniates historian D.R Regmi.

 अनेक विजयानन्त प्रतिष्ठा पृथिवीराजकर्मणा लिच्छवी कुलकेतुः
 Translation: Lichchhavi Kulaketu, through numerous conquests, established his authority on the earth.
 सकल सत्वानुग्रहित मनोहिराभिमान रमणीयं चरितं लिच्छवी कुलकेतुः
 Translation: Lichchhavi Kulaketu, with a charming character that captured the hearts of all, favored by all living beings.

Personal life 
Jishnu Gupta was a grandson of Bhauma Gupta, who, probably, also ascended to the highest authority during the reign of Ganadeva.

References 

7th-century Nepalese people
Nepalese people